Brian Jackson (2 February 1936 – 1992) was an English footballer.

Career 
Jackson played for Maltby Main, Rotherham United and Barnsley.

Notes 

1936 births
People from Maltby, South Yorkshire
1992 deaths
English footballers
Association football midfielders
Maltby Main F.C. players
Rotherham United F.C. players
Barnsley F.C. players
Footballers from Yorkshire